The women's 100 metre backstroke competition of the swimming events at the 1955 Pan American Games took place on 24 March. The last Pan American Games champion was Maureen O'Brien of US.

This race consisted of two lengths of the pool, all in backstroke.

Results
All times are in minutes and seconds.

Heats

Final 
The final was held on March 24.

References

Swimming at the 1955 Pan American Games
Pan